is a Japanese manga series written and illustrated by Aiko Koyama. It has been serialized in Shogakukan's Weekly Shōnen Sunday magazine since December 2016, with its chapters collected in twenty-one tankōbon volumes as of October 2022. The series takes place in the Geisha district in Kyoto and follows the titular character Kiyo as she cooks up delicacies every day to support her friend Sumire and the other maiko.

An anime television series adaptation by J.C.Staff aired worldwide from February 2021 to January 2022 on NHK World, and it was followed by a Japanese broadcast on NHK E from October 2021 to June 2022. A live-action series, executive produced, written and directed by Hirokazu Kore-eda for Netflix, premiered in January 2023.

By September 2022, the manga had over 2.7 million copies in circulation. In 2020, Kiyo in Kyoto won the 65th Shogakukan Manga Award for the shōnen category.

Synopsis
Kiyo and Sumire are childhood friends from Aomori Prefecture who move to Kyoto to become maiko. During their training, Sumire excels through her talent and diligence. Kiyo, meanwhile, has difficulty learning the basic skills and is eventually expelled. However, Kiyo's talent in cooking is discovered, and she is hired as the new cook of the maiko house. Kiyo is happy with her new role: supporting Sumire and the other maiko through her cooking.

Characters

A 16 year-old girl from Aomori who came to Kyoto to become a maiko, but her teachers thought she was too clumsy. However, the other apprentices loved her cooking, so she now works at the maiko house as a live-in cook.
 / 

Kiyo's childhood friend from Aomori who came to Kyoto with her. Unlike Kiyo, Sumire has talent at being a maiko, earning praise from the geisha overseeing her training.

Kiyo and Sumire's childhood friend who goes to a high school in Aomori.

A senior maiko who lives in the maiko house where Kiyo works.

The "mother" of the maiko house. She is responsible for all of the maiko and geisha's living arrangements and for their training and preparation.

An assistant of the maiko house. He is responsible for dressing the geisha and maiko in their kimonos.

Provides tidbits of information on maiko culture and lifestyle.

Media

Manga
Kiyo in Kyoto: From the Maiko House is written and illustrated by Aiko Koyama. The series began in Shogakukan's Weekly Shōnen Sunday on December 28, 2016. The series went on hiatus from June 1–29, 2022. Shogakukan has collected its chapters into individual tankōbon volumes. The first volume was released on April 12, 2017. As of October 12, 2022, twenty-one volumes have been released.

The manga has been licensed by Elex Media Komputindo in Indonesia.

Volume list

Anime
In March 2020, NHK announced that the series would be adapted into an anime television series. The series is animated by J.C.Staff, and directed by Yōhei Suzuki, with Susumu Yamakawa overseeing scripts, and Go Sakabe composing the series' music. It aired worldwide on the NHK World-Japan channel from February 25, 2021, to January 27, 2022, and it was followed by a Japanese broadcast on NHK E from October 2, 2021 to June 11, 2022.  The opening theme song is "Ashita Kitto" by Ayano Tsuji.

In addition to each episode being on NHK World-Japan's free on-demand service for a year after broadcast,<ref>{{cite web|title=Chapter 7: Kiyo Arrives in Kyoto Part 1, Chapter 8: Kiyo Arrives in Kyoto Part 2, Chapter 9: An Apprentice Maiko's Morning - 'Maiko-san Chi no Makanai-san - Kiyo in Kyoto: From the Maiko House -|url=https://www3.nhk.or.jp/nhkworld/en/ondemand/video/2094003/|publisher=NHK World-Japan|access-date=2 April 2022|quote=Broadcast on April 22, 2021 Available until April 22, 2022|archive-date=April 2, 2022|archive-url=https://web.archive.org/web/20220402183708/https://www3.nhk.or.jp/nhkworld/en/ondemand/video/2094003/|url-status=live}}</ref> Crunchyroll is also streaming the series with English subtitles outside of Asia. In Southeast Asia, the series is licensed by JOYUPMEDIA and is streaming on Bilibili. The series ran for 12 episodes. Each episode features a "Dish of the Day" segment, in which Kiyo, Sumire, and Tsurukoma discuss the dishes that appeared in each episode's three segments. 

Episode list

Drama
In January 2022, it was announced that a nine-episode drama adaptation, titled in English as The Makanai: Cooking for the Maiko House, would premiere worldwide on Netflix in 2023. It is directed by Hirokazu Kore-eda, Megumi Tsuno, Hiroshi Okuyama and Takuma Sato, with Genki Kawamura in charge of planning; screenplay by Kore-eda, Tsuna, Okuyama, Sato and Mami Sunada; Yoshihiro Furusawa and Naomi Sato serving as executive producers; Kenji Yamada, Ai Kashima and Eiji Kitahara are producing the series; Risa Kitabayashi as an associate producer; and music composed by Yoko Kanno. It premiered on Netflix on January 12, 2023.

ReceptionKiyo in Kyoto won the 65th Shogakukan Manga Award for the shōnen'' category in 2020.

By October 2019, the manga had 700,000 copies in circulation; over 1 million copies in circulation by March 2020; and over 2.7 million copies in circulation by of September 2022.

Notes

References

Further reading

External links
  
 
 
 

2021 anime television series debuts
Anime series based on manga
Cooking in anime and manga
Crunchyroll anime
Iyashikei anime and manga
J.C.Staff
Kyoto in fiction
NHK original programming
Shogakukan manga
Shōnen manga
Television shows set in Kyoto
Winners of the Shogakukan Manga Award for shōnen manga